The Ambassador Extraordinary and Plenipotentiary of the Russian Federation to New Zealand is the official representative of the President and the Government of the Russian Federation to the Prime Minister and the Government of New Zealand.

The ambassador and his staff work at large in the Embassy of Russia in Wellington. The ambassador of Russia to New Zealand is concurrently accredited to Samoa and Tonga.

History of diplomatic relations

Diplomatic relations between the Soviet Union and New Zealand were established at the mission level on 13 April 1944. The first envoy, Ivan Zyabkin, was appointed on 22 June 1945 and presented his credentials on 26 June that year. The mission was upgraded to an embassy 19 April 1973. With the dissolution of the Soviet Union in 1991, the Soviet ambassador, continued as representative of the Russian Federation until 1992.

List of representatives (1945 – present)

Representatives of the Soviet Union to New Zealand (1945 – 1991)

Representatives of the Russian Federation to New Zealand (1991 – present)

References

External links

 
New Zealand
Russia